Fiona Loewi (born 1975) is a Canadian actress. She attended McGill University and the London Academy of Music and Dramatic Art. She is perhaps best known for Love and Death on Long Island. Her married name is Fiona Loewi Reinhardt and she is the mother of three children and lives in Los Angeles, CA. She and her husband Sandro are co-owners of Cheebo, an American cuisine organic food restaurant in Los Angeles.

Film 
 National Lampoon's Senior Trip (1995)
 Love and Death on Long Island (1997)
 Blackheart (1998)
 Top of the Food Chain (1999) 
 Buying the Cow (2001)
 My Dinner with Jimi (2003)
 Greed (2006)

Television 
 Once a Thief (1997) (guest star)
 Secret Agent Man (2000) (guest star)
 Drive Time Murders aka Breakfast with Dick and Dorothy (2001) (TV movie)
 Killer Bees! (2002) (TV movie)
 CSI:Miami (2007) (guest star)

Awards and nominations

References

External links 
 

1975 births
Living people
Actresses from London
Actresses from Vancouver
Canadian film actresses
Canadian television actresses
McGill University alumni
Alumni of the London Academy of Music and Dramatic Art